RMO (Relation Main d'Oeuvre) was a French professional cycling team that existed from 1986 to 1992. Its main sponsor was French supplier of temporary workers Relation Main d'Oeuvre. Its most notable results were the mountains classification of the 1990 Tour de France with Thierry Claveyrolat and the 1991 Paris–Roubaix with Marc Madiot.

References

External links

Cycling teams based in France
Defunct cycling teams based in France
1986 establishments in France
1992 disestablishments in France
Cycling teams established in 1986
Cycling teams disestablished in 1992